Hurlford railway station was a railway station serving the village of Hurlford, East Ayrshire, Scotland. The station was originally part of the Glasgow, Paisley, Kilmarnock and Ayr Railway.

History
The station opened on 9 August 1848 and closed to passengers on 7 March 1955.

The Garrochburn Goods Depot lay a few miles to the south and until circa 1926 a Mossgiel Tunnel Platform was located just to the north of the northern Mossgiel Tunnel portal.

Today the line is still open as part of the Glasgow South Western Line.

References
 
 

Disused railway stations in East Ayrshire
Railway stations in Great Britain opened in 1848
Railway stations in Great Britain closed in 1955
Former Glasgow and South Western Railway stations